Events from the year 1608 in Denmark.

Incumbents 
 Monarch – Christian IV

Events

Undated
 Rumors and accusations about sorcery began to spread in the town of Køge, starting what will eventually turn into the Køge Huskors  witch trial.
 The privy Council and representatives of the Estates support the King in naming Prince Christian heir apparent.
 A corner bastionsome ten years later adapted into what is now known as Christian IV's Brewhouseis constructed on Slotsholmen in Copenhagen.
 The Caritas Well is constructed on Gammeltorv in Copenhagen.
 Frederiksborg Castle in Hillerød is expanded with a new east wing (The Princess's Wing).

Births
 28 October  Hans Schack, military officer (died 1787)

Full date missing
 Matthias Hermansen Kalthoff, gunsmith (died 1681)

Deaths 
 30 January  Jon Jakobsen Venusinus, theologian, naturalist and historian (born c. 1558)

References 

 
Denmark
Years of the 17th century in Denmark